The 1999 Sabah state election was held between Friday, 12 March and Saturday, 13 March 1999. The election was won by Barisan Nasional increasing the number of seats it won in the 1994 election from 23 to 31.

Results

Aftermath

CM rotation system

After BN regains power in Sabah in 1994, it introduced Chief Minister rotation system between Muslim bumiputera, Non-Muslim bumiputera, and Chinese leaders for two year tenure each. This was one of the promises of BN during the 1994 election campaign. For the Muslim bumiputera quota, Osu Sukam of UMNO becomes CM after BN won in the 1999 elections. He held the role until 2001, when Chong Kah Kiat of LDP becomes CM, filling the Chinese/Non-Muslim bumiputera quota in a slightly changed rotation system. In 2003, Kah Kiat hands over the CM role to Musa Aman from UMNO, who scrapped the rotation system after BN dominates in the 2004 state election, with 59 wins out of 60 seats contested.

References

Sabah state elections
Sabah